José Albino (born 23 June 1975) is a Mozambican footballer. He played in 14 matches for the Mozambique national football team in 1998 and 1999. He was also named in Mozambique's squad for the 1998 African Cup of Nations tournament.

References

External links
 
 

1975 births
Living people
Mozambican footballers
Mozambique international footballers
1998 African Cup of Nations players
Place of birth missing (living people)
Association football defenders
Clube Ferroviário de Maputo footballers